Jorge García Hurtado (born 27 August 1998) is a professional Nicaraguan football forward currently playing for Walter Ferretti in the Nicaraguan Primera División.

García was included in the Nicaragua national football team that played in the 2017 CONCACAF Gold Cup.

References

External links 
 

Nicaraguan men's footballers
Nicaragua international footballers
1998 births
Living people
Association football forwards
Sportspeople from Managua
2017 CONCACAF Gold Cup players